The National Agricultural Center and Hall of Fame is a museum and educational facility in Bonner Springs, Kansas, United States.  The group holds a congressional charter under Title 36 of the United States Code (issued in 1960). It is located east of K-7 and south of State Avenue (US-24, near 126th Street) next to the Sandstone Amphitheater and Kansas City Renaissance Festival.  It is north of the Kansas Turnpike "Bonner Springs" exit, and about 1 miles west of the Kansas Speedway.

Components

Main Building
The Main Building built in 1963-64 includes:
 Gallery of Rural Art
 National Agricultural Hall of Fame
 Hall of Rural Living
 National Farm Broadcasters Hall of Fame
 Rural Electric Conference Theater
 National Farmer's Memorial
 National Poultry Museum

Museum of Farming
The  building opened in 1967.  Much of the museum's 30,000 artifacts, including an extensive collection of farm implements, are housed there.

Farm Town, U.S.A.
This recreation a rural village which opened in 1968 includes:
 Blacksmith Shop
 School House
 General Store
 Poultry Hatchery
 Railroad Depot
 Union Pacific Caboose
 Operational narrow-gauge train
 Farm House
 Farm Shed
 Chicken Coop
 Eight-sided Wooden Silo
 75-seat outdoor Pavilion
 Smith Event Barn

See also
 Agricultural Research Service Science Hall of Fame
 Freedom's Frontier National Heritage Area
 Fort Scott National Historic Site, Frontier Military Road destination

References

External links
 National Agricultural Center and Hall of Fame, official website

Agri
Halls of fame in Kansas
Agriculture museums in the United States
History museums in Kansas
Open-air museums in Kansas
Museums in Wyandotte County, Kansas
Museums established in 1960
1960 establishments in the United States
Agricultural organizations based in the United States
Patriotic and national organizations chartered by the United States Congress